The Military Order of St. Henry (Militär-St. Heinrichs-Orden) was a military order of the Kingdom of Saxony, a member state of the German Empire. The order was the oldest military order of the states of the German Empire. It was founded on October 7, 1736 by Augustus III, King of Poland and Elector of Saxony. The order underwent several more revisions over the course of the 19th and early 20th centuries. It became obsolete with the fall of the Saxon monarchy in the wake of Germany's defeat in World War I.

Classes
The order came in four classes: Grand Cross (Großkreuz), Commander's Cross 1st Class (Kommandeurkreuz I. Klasse), Commander's Cross 2nd Class (Kommandeurkreuz II. Klasse) or sometimes just Commander, and Knight's Cross (Ritterkreuz). Generally, the rank of the recipient determined which grade he would receive - the Grand Cross went to monarchs and the highest field commanders, the Commander 1st Class to senior generals, the Commander 2nd Class to officers major and above (with a few exceptions) and the Knight's Cross to all officers. Again with few exceptions, one was required to have received a lower grade before receiving the next higher grade. During World War I, there were 12 awards of the Grand Cross, 14 awards of the Commander 1st Class, 153 awards of the Commander 2nd Class, and 2,728 awards of the Knight's Cross As an example of the progression, Rupprecht, Crown Prince of Bavaria, a general and later field marshal, received the Knight's Cross in August 1914, the Commander 2nd Class in June 1915, the Commander 1st Class in January 1917, and the Grand Cross in May 1918.

Description and wear
The badge of the order was a gold Maltese cross with white-enameled edges. Around the center medallion was a blue-enameled gold ring bearing on the obverse the words "FRIDR•AUG•D•G•REX•SAX•INSTAURAVIT" and on the reverse the motto "VIRTUTI IN BELLO" ("Bravery in War"). On the obverse, the medallion was yellow-enameled with a painted portrait of St. Henry, the last Saxon Holy Roman Emperor. On the reverse, the medallion bore the Saxon coat of arms (alternating horizontal black and gold stripes with a diagonal rue crown). Between the arms of the cross were green-enameled rue crowns, a symbol of Saxony. The badge was suspended from a royal crown. The Grand Cross was larger than the Commander's Cross, and the Commander's Cross was larger than the Knight's Cross.

The star of the order, awarded with the Grand Cross and the Commander 1st Class, was a silver eight-pointed star featuring a larger version of the medallion with St. Henry of the obverse of the cross, but with the text of the ring of the reverse. The star was slightly larger for the Grand Cross.

The ribbon of the order was light blue with yellow stripes near each edge.

The Knight's Cross was worn as a breast badge on the upper left chest. The Commander's Crosses were worn from the neck, with the breast star of the Commander 1st Class on the lower left chest. The Grand Cross was worn from a sash over the shoulder, with the badge resting on the left hip. Its star was worn as with the Commander 1st Class. On occasion, the Grand Cross badge was worn from the neck and was distinguishable from the Commander's Crosses only by its size.

Notable recipients

Grand Crosses

 Albert of Saxony
 Alexander, Margrave of Meissen
 Michael Andreas Barclay de Tolly
 Prince Bernhard of Saxe-Weimar-Eisenach (1792–1862)
 Charles I of Austria
 Charles XIV John
 Louis-Nicolas Davout
 Ernest I, Duke of Saxe-Coburg and Gotha
 Franz Joseph I of Austria
 Frederick Augustus II of Saxony
 Frederick Augustus III of Saxony
 Frederick III, German Emperor
 Prince Friedrich Karl of Prussia (1828–1885)
 George, King of Saxony
 Josip Jelačić
 Paul von Hindenburg
 Maria Emanuel, Margrave of Meissen
 Helmuth von Moltke the Elder
 Rupprecht, Crown Prince of Bavaria
 Wilhelm II, German Emperor
 Wilhelm, German Crown Prince
 William I, German Emperor
 William II of Württemberg

Commanders 1st Class 

 Gustav von Alvensleben
 Prince August of Württemberg
 Karl von Einem
 August Karl von Goeben
 Ernest II, Duke of Saxe-Coburg and Gotha
 Charles Joseph, comte de Flahaut
 Archduke Friedrich, Duke of Teschen
 Oskar von Hutier
 Hans von Kirchbach
 Prince Leopold of Bavaria
 August von Mackensen
 Emmanuel von Mensdorff-Pouilly
 Friedrich Sixt von Armin

Commanders 2nd Class 

 Felix Graf von Bothmer
 Franz Conrad von Hötzendorf
 Karl Ludwig d'Elsa
 Hermann von Eichhorn
 Ernst II, Duke of Saxe-Altenburg
 Max Immelmann
 Maximilian von Laffert
 Fritz von Loßberg
 Charles Antoine Morand
 Alexander August Wilhelm von Pape
 Johann Pflugbeil
 Ferdinand von Quast
 Remus von Woyrsch

Knights 

 Prince Eitel Friedrich of Prussia
 Erich von Falkenhayn
 Prince Karl Theodor of Bavaria
 Karl Theodor, Duke in Bavaria
 Erich Ludendorff
 Karl August Nerger
 Hans von Plessen
 Manfred von Richthofen
 Otto Weddigen
 Maximilian Wengler
 Georg Zeumer
 George Albert, Prince of Schwarzburg-Rudolstadt

Unknown 

 Otto von Below
 Eduard von Böhm-Ermolli
 Dietrich von Choltitz
 Georg, Crown Prince of Saxony
 Edmond de Talleyrand-Périgord
 Max von Gallwitz
 Max Hoffmann
 Alexander von Linsingen
 Friedrich Olbricht

References
 Artur Baumgarten-Crusius, bearb., Sachsen in grosser Zeit (1919)
 Neal O'Connor, Aviation Awards of Imperial Germany in World War I and the Men Who Earned Them: Volume III - The Aviation Awards of the Kingdom of Saxony (1993).
 Dr. Kurt-Gerhard Klietmann, Pour le Mérite und Tapferkeitsmedaille (1966).
 Website on the Decorations of the Kingdom of Saxony
 Website on Sachsens-Orden
 Official website of the "Order of St. Henry" (Sankt Heinrich Orden) in German

Notes

Military of Saxony
Kingdom of Saxony
Orders, decorations, and medals of Saxony
Awards established in 1736
1736 establishments in the Holy Roman Empire